Coast is an American brand of deodorant soap and body wash owned by High Ridge Brands Company. It was originally introduced by Procter & Gamble in 1976. Its marketing catchphrase is "The Eye Opener!" Originally a bar soap, the company also began to produce body wash in 2003.

In 2000, the Coast brand was sold by Procter & Gamble to The Dial Corporation, an Arizona-based company that became a subsidiary of Henkel in 2004. 

In 2012, the Coast brand was sold by Henkel to Brynwood Partners VI LP, a Stamford, Connecticut-based firm, through its subsidiary, High Ridge Brands Company (HRB), which owns a variety of personal care products, including Zest, Alberto VO5, and Rave. HRB was later sold to Clayton, Dubilier & Rice and is now a portfolio component of Tengram Capital Partners.

Marketing
The target market for Coast soap has always been men. In 2006, the company won a "Top 100 Rebrand award" for a packaging redesign that was credited with doubling sales of the body wash product and maintaining a market presence that had been declining for the bar soaps. To recognize the 35th anniversary of Coast soap, it was marketed in limited-edition "throwback" packaging from the late 1970s, and an online gallery featured several decades of advertisements for the product.

The company has sponsored a car in the Indianapolis 500 and the rest of the Indy Racing League schedule.

References

External links 
 

Soap brands
Former Procter & Gamble brands
Products introduced in 1976